The 2019 AusTiger international basketball tournament, also known as the 2019 Austiger Cup, is a men's international basketball competition between national teams, scheduled to be held from 23 to 27 August 2019 in Shenyang, China. The tournament is organized prior to the 2019 FIBA Basketball World Cup hosted by China. The competition is played under FIBA rules as a round-robin tournament. National teams of France, Italy, New Zealand, and Serbia will play at the tournament.

Participating teams

Venues

Tournament

Standings

Matches 
All times are local UTC+8.

Final standing

Statistics 

Top Scorers PPG

Rebounds

Assists

References

See also 
 2019 Italy FIBA Basketball World Cup team
 2019 Serbia FIBA Basketball World Cup team
 Acropolis Tournament
 Basketball at the Summer Olympics
 FIBA Basketball World Cup
 FIBA Asia Cup
 FIBA Diamond Ball
 Adecco Cup
 Marchand Continental Championship Cup
 Belgrade Trophy
 Stanković Cup
 William Jones Cup

Shenyang
2019 in New Zealand basketball
2019–20 in French basketball
2019–20 in Italian basketball
2019–20 in Serbian basketball
Serbia at the 2019 FIBA Basketball World Cup
Italy at the 2019 FIBA Basketball World Cup
International basketball competitions hosted by China
2019 in Chinese sport
Sport in Anshan
Sport in Shenyang